287 Broadway is a historical building on the corner of Broadway at Reade Street in the Tribeca neighborhood of Lower Manhattan, New York City. Designed by John B. Snook in 1871 using cast-iron in mixed Italianate and French Second Empire style, it was completed in 1872 for the Stephen Storm estate.

History
Attorney William Alexander owned the site as early as 1794, when it contained a dwelling and carriage house. The house was purchased by Elbert Anderson in 1816 who demolished it two years later, and built a commercial building in 1819. In 1821, Storm purchased the property. With others, he built the Irving House Hotel in 1848–49. In 1871, Storm's estate hired Snook to design a commercial building to be used for banking and office space. The Union Pacific Railroad Company was an early tenant, as was Henry Bischoff & Company. The Gindi family purchased the property in 1969. Already tilted , it began to lead an additional  in 2007 during excavation work at 57 Reade Street, forcing the city government to vacate it. In 2013, 287 Broadway was purchased for US$8 million by the Laboz family's United American Land company which affirmed the structural stability of the building and began a renovation for ground-floor retail space and residential rental lofts on the higher floors.

After years of lobbying led by Margot Gayle and her group Friends of Cast-iron Architecture, 287 Broadway was designated a landmark on August 29, 1989. At the designation hearing it was described as one of the few surviving examples in New York City of a cast-iron building designed in mixed Italianate and French Second Empire architecture styles.

Architecture and fittings
The six-story building is of mixed Italianate and French Second Empire architectural style. The façade is of cast-iron and the slat shingles are original to the building, which also features a mansard roof, dormers, segmented pediments, round-arched windows, Otis elevator, as well as Ionic and Corinthian columns. Steel shoring was added in 2008 against the south facade, replacing timber bracing added in 2007 following excavation work at 57 Reade Street. In December 2020, the shoring/bracing was removed.

See also
 List of New York City Designated Landmarks in Manhattan below 14th Street

References

1872 establishments in New York (state)
Broadway (Manhattan)
Cast-iron architecture in New York City
Civic Center, Manhattan
Commercial buildings completed in 1872
New York City Designated Landmarks in Manhattan
Office buildings in Manhattan
Tribeca